Fernand Chevalier (8 December 1898 – 9 May 1980) was a French politician.

Chevalier was born in El Affroun, Algeria. He represented the Republican Party of Liberty (PRL) in the Constituent Assembly elected in 1946 and in the National Assembly from 1946 to 1951.

References

1898 births
1980 deaths
People from Blida Province
People of French Algeria
Pieds-Noirs
Republican Party of Liberty politicians
Members of the Constituent Assembly of France (1946)
Deputies of the 1st National Assembly of the French Fourth Republic